DRE may refer to:

 Dre (album), 2010 by American rapper Soulja Boy Tell 'Em, 2010
 Dre (name)
Dr. Dre, American rapper and producer
 DRE voting machine
 Digital rectal examination, in medicine
 Director of religious education; for example, 
 Directorio Revolucionario Estudiantil, CIA backed anti-Castro group based in Miami
 Drug Recognition Expert
 Drug resistant epilepsy, in neurology
 Dense-rock equivalent in geology/volcanolgy